Epiperipatus ohausi is a species of velvet worm in the family Peripatidae. Males of this species have 26 to 28 pairs of legs; females have 27 to 29.

References

Onychophorans of tropical America
Onychophoran species
Animals described in 1900